Edmonton Green may refer to:

 Edmonton, London, an area of London, United Kingdom
 Edmonton Green Shopping Centre
 Edmonton Green railway station, the station which reflected the informal name to Edmonton